The first season of Wilfred, premiered on FX on June 23, 2011. The season contains 13 episodes and concluded airing on September 8, 2011. The series is based on the original Australian series, Wilfred, and stars Elijah Wood, Jason Gann, Fiona Gubelmann and Dorian Brown.

Synopsis 
The season began with Ryan, an ex-lawyer, trying to commit suicide by overdosing on pills. His sister, Kristen, knowing that giving out pills to family members is unethical, decides to give him sugar pills without him knowing. At first, he does not know and thinks that Wilfred is just a hallucination, then after a visit from his sister, he finds out about the sugar pills, therefore it is unknown exactly why only Ryan sees Wilfred the way he is.  Throughout the first season Wilfred puts Ryan in difficult situations including tricking Ryan into breaking into the neighbor's house while Wilfred steals the man's marijuana plants and defecates in his boots. Ryan confesses everything to his neighbor and is assaulted. Wilfred uses Ryan's growing crush on Jenna to convince Ryan to sabotage Jenna's relationship with her long-distance boyfriend Drew. 

Ryan saves Wilfred after he learns that the doggy daycare manager, who he starts leaving him with, is molesting Wilfred, and Wilfred saves a stuffed teddy bear.  Wilfred begins having sex with this stuffed animal, with whom he communicates in the same way Ryan communicates with Wilfred.  Wilfred also pressures Ryan into pursuing a sexual relationship with a tightly-wound single mother, mainly because Wilfred is infatuated with her son's stuffed giraffe.  Ryan also simulates sex with the giraffe on Wilfred pleading until the son sees him. Wilfred also helps Ryan understand that he was not responsible for the death of his childhood dog, Sneakers.  The audience learns that Ryan's mentally unstable mother can see her cat, Mittens, in a similar fashion that Ryan sees Wilfred.  Ryan discovers a man, Bruce, who claims to be able to see Wilfred the same way that Ryan sees Wilfred, and tries to convince Ryan to not trust Wilfred.  After a struggle, Ryan learns that Bruce and Wilfred were playing a game to test Ryan's trust with Wilfred.

At the end of the season, Jenna accidentally ingests a marijuana-laced candy from Ryan’s house before her first time as an anchorperson and gets fired from her job, after which Ryan decides to represent her in a legal battle to get her job back.  Although Ryan is used to digging up dirt on his opponents in order to win, he decides not to this time. However, Wilfred does instead and Ryan uses this evidence to get Jenna her job back.

Ryan uses his newfound "power" to break up Drew and Jenna, and gets a date with Jenna.  When he finds out that she needs to take a drug test he blackmails his sister (with knowledge of a previous affair) into giving him her urine so Jenna will pass the test. This causes a wedge between Ryan and Kristen and she leaves for India. However, Kristen is pregnant, which shows up in Jenna's urine test.  Jenna now believes she is pregnant so she gets back together with Drew. Wilfred gets into a car accident and gets amnesia and does not remember Ryan.  The season ends with Ryan running back to his house remembering a will Wilfred was writing before the accident so Ryan would know what to do if anything happened to him.  Ryan tries to open the door to his basement only to discover it is in fact a closet. A tennis ball (linking back to the first episode in the season) rolls out of the closet, leaving Ryan puzzled.

Cast

Main cast 
 Elijah Wood as Ryan Newman
 Jason Gann as Wilfred
 Fiona Gubelmann as Jenna Mueller
 Dorian Brown as Kristen Newman

Special guest cast 
 Ethan Suplee as Spencer
 Ed Helms as Darryl
 Jane Kaczmarek as Beth
 Mary Steenburgen as Catherine
 Dwight Yoakam as Bruce

Recurring cast 
 Chris Klein as Drew
 J. P. Manoux as Leo
 Gerry Bednob as Mr. Patel
 Rodney To as Dr. Bangachon

Guest stars 
 Charles Esten as Nick
 Ellia English as Ruby
 Damon Herriman as Jesse
 Rashida Jones as Lisa
 Nestor Carbonell as Arturo Ramos
 Rhea Perlman as Mittens
 John Michael Higgins as Dr. Cahill
 Peter Stormare as Trashface
 George Coe as Gene
 Eric Stoltz as Doug (uncredited)
 Katy Mixon as Angelique
 Ray Wise as Colt St. Cloud
 Keegan-Michael Key as Dick Barbian

Episodes

Production 
Wilfred is based on the critically acclaimed Australian series of the same name and was adapted for FX by Family Guy veteran David Zuckerman. Wilfred is produced by FX Productions while the executive producers include: Zuckerman; Rich and Paul Frank; Jeff Kwatinetz; and Joe and Ken Connor from the original Australian series. Wilfred co-creator Jason Gann and Randall Einhorn serve as co-executive producers. Einhorn directed 10 episodes of the first season and Victor Nelli, Jr. directed three. The pilot episode was filmed in summer 2010, written by Zuckerman, and directed by Einhorn. The show was shot primarily with the inexpensive Canon EOS 7D dSLR camera. The first episode of the show was included in the It's Always Sunny in Philadelphia: The Complete Season 6 DVD.

Notes

References

External links 

2011 American television seasons
Season 1